Protonephrocerus is a genus of flies belonging to the family Pipunculidae.

Species
Protonephrocerus chiloensis Collin, 1931
Protonephrocerus flavipilus Skevington, Marques & Rafael, 2021
Protonephrocerus misionensis Skevington, 2021

References

Pipunculidae
Brachycera genera
Diptera of South America
Taxa named by James Edward Collin